Garcke is a surname. Notable people with the surname include:

 Christian August Friedrich Garcke (1819–1904), German botanist
 Emile Garcke (1856–1930), German-British electrical engineer and entrepreneur
 Harald Garcke (born 1963), German mathematician and professor